Kitgum Hospital, is a government-owned hospital in Northern Uganda. It serves as the district hospital for Kitgum District.

Location
The coordinates of Kitgum Hospital are:3°17'39.0"N, 32°52'52.0"E (Latitude:3.294167; Longitude:32.881111).

Overview
Kitgum Hospital is a public hospital, established in 1934. It is intended to serve as the district hospital for Kitgum District and surrounding communities. A large number of patients are attended to from the districts of Abim,  Agago,  Kabong,  Kotido, Lamwo, Nwoya and Pader. A significant number of the hospital patients come from neighboring South Sudan. This has put great strain on the hospital resources, including the understaffed, underpaid personnel; the dilapidated and antiquated infrastructure & equipment and the inadequate financial resources.

See also
Hospitals in Uganda
Health in Uganda
St. Joseph's Hospital Kitgum

References

External links
 Kitgum District Information Portal
  US Army Training Camp Brings Hope To Kitgum

Kitgum
Acholi sub-region
Kitgum District
Northern Region, Uganda